Mark Christopher Bauer (born October 28, 1966) is an American actor. He is best known for his television work in The Wire, Third Watch, True Blood, Survivor's Remorse, The Deuce and the Apple TV+ original science fiction space drama series For All Mankind. He has also appeared on Broadway, as Mitch in A Streetcar Named Desire, and has originated roles in plays by David Mamet, John Patrick Shanley and Jez Butterworth.

Early life and education
Bauer was born in Los Angeles, California, and is of German and Irish descent. He attended Miramonte High School in Orinda, California and played on the Miramonte football team in his senior year, 1984, the year the team won the state championship. Later, he attended the University of San Diego and the American Academy of Dramatic Arts, and graduated from the Yale School of Drama.

Career

Television
Bauer has starred in numerous television series including The Wire, as port-union boss Frank Sobotka. He initially auditioned for the role of Jimmy McNulty. He also starred in Billy Crystal's 2001 film 61*, as New York Yankees player Bob Cerv. His roles on network television include a regular role as Fred Yokas, husband of Officer Faith Yokas, on the NBC series Third Watch, lead FBI Agent Dodd on the short-lived CBS series Smith, a priest on ABC's Life on Mars, and as Detective Lou Destefano in the original Sci-Fi channel miniseries The Lost Room. In 2004, he played Lee Nickel on the ESPN series Tilt. He appeared in the episode "The No-Brainer" of the television series Fringe as Brian Dempsey, and appeared in multiple episodes of Numb3rs as Dr. Raymond "Ray" Galuski and in Criminal Minds, in season one, as the antagonist.

Chris Bauer played Det. (later Sheriff) Andy Bellefleur on the TV-series True Blood. He also played Dennis Halsey, a guard on Unforgettable in the fourth episode of the first season, "Up In Flames", and appeared as a rival salesman from the Syracuse branch of Dunder Mifflin in Season 8 of The Office (US). In 2014, Bauer guest starred in an episode of NBC's Parks and Recreation.

In October 2014 Bauer started a recurring role on the Starz comedy Survivor's Remorse. He played Jimmy Flaherty, the owner of a fictitious Atlanta professional basketball team. The show was written by Mike O'Malley, who also served as an executive producer along with NBA star LeBron James, and star Jessie T. Usher. Survivor's Remorse ran 4 seasons and concluded in 2017.

Bauer played Det. Tom Lange in the FX limited series American Crime Story. Bauer appeared as Tim Rutten in the NBC mini-series Law & Order True Crime: The Menendez Brothers, and from 2017 co-stars as Bobby Dwyer in the HBO series The Deuce.

In 2018, Bauer guest starred as the negotiator Dennis Cole in Brooklyn Nine-Nine Series 5 Episode 13 "The Negotiator".

In 2019, Bauer portrayed NASA astronaut and Director of Flight Crew Operations Deke Slayton in the first season of the Apple TV+ original science fiction space drama series For All Mankind.

Film
Bauer's first film appearance was in Snow White: A Tale of Terror, with Sigourney Weaver, Sam Neill, and Monica Keena. Soon after, Bauer played schoolteacher/pedophile Lloyd Gettys in the 1997 film The Devil's Advocate. He played prisoner NB9674932-65 Ivan Dubov in the 1997 action film Face/Off, where he met Nicolas Cage. He then appeared as the masked character 'Machine' in the 1999 film 8mm also starring Cage. He starred as fetish photographer Irving Klaw in the 2005 Bettie Page biopic The Notorious Bettie Page, and as famous author Ken Kesey in a 2007 Neal Cassady biopic. Bauer played a small role in the 2005 Jim Jarmusch film, Broken Flowers. He was featured in the movie The Conspirator, as a fellow officer following Abraham Lincoln's assassination, and played a minor role in Flags of Our Fathers. In 2015, Bauer played the role of 'Pa' in Disney's Tomorrowland. He also appeared in Money Monster as Lt. Nelson, and played Larry Rooney in Sully.

Filmography

Film

Television

Awards and nominations

References

External links

 
 

1966 births
20th-century American male actors
21st-century American male actors
American Academy of Dramatic Arts alumni
American people of German descent
American people of Irish descent
American male film actors
American male television actors
Male actors from Los Angeles
Miramonte High School alumni
People from Orinda, California
University of San Diego alumni
Living people
Yale School of Drama alumni